|}

The Ballyogan Stakes is a Group 3 flat horse race in Ireland open to thoroughbred fillies and mares aged three years or older. It is run at The Curragh over a distance of 6 furlongs (1,207 metres), and it is scheduled to take place each year in June.

The event was formerly contested at Leopardstown over 5 furlongs and open to horses of either gender. It was held at Cork from 2002 to 2004, and on the last occasion it became a 6-furlong race for fillies and mares. It returned to Leopardstown from 2005 to 2014 before moving to The Curragh from 2015.

Records
Most successful horse:
 no horse has won this race more than once since 1975

Leading jockey since 1975 (4 wins):
 Tommy Murphy – Boone's Cabin (1975), Godswalk (1977), Solinus (1978), Monroe (1980)
 Michael Kinane – Reelin Jig (1976), Committed (1985), Lidanna (1998), Dietrich (2001)

Leading trainer since 1975 (7 wins):
 Vincent O'Brien – Boone's Cabin (1975), Godswalk (1977), Solinus (1978), Golden Thatch (1979), Monroe (1980), Longleat (1982), Bluebird (1987)

Winners since 1975

See also
 Horse racing in Ireland
 List of Irish flat horse races

References
 Racing Post:
 galopp-sieger.de – Ballyogan Stakes.
 ifhaonline.org – International Federation of Horseracing Authorities – Ballyogan Stakes (2019).
 irishracinggreats.com – Ballyogan Stakes (Group 3).
 pedigreequery.com – Ballyogan Stakes – Leopardstown.

Flat races in Ireland
Sprint category horse races for fillies and mares
Curragh Racecourse